The 1957 Milan–San Remo was the 48th edition of the Milan–San Remo cycle race and was held on 19 March 1957. The race started in Milan and finished in San Remo. The race was won by Miguel Poblet.

General classification

References

1957
1957 in road cycling
1957 in Italian sport
1957 Challenge Desgrange-Colombo
March 1957 sports events in Europe